Nattapong Sayriya (born 17 January 1992) is a Thai professional footballer who currently plays for Nakhon Ratchasima in the Thai League T1.

References

External links
 

1992 births
Living people
Nattapong Sayriya
Association football defenders
Nattapong Sayriya
Nattapong Sayriya